The 2015 WAFF U-16 Championship is the fifth edition of the WAFF Youth Competition. The previous edition was an Under-16 age group competition held in Palestine in 2013.

Participating nations
5 West Asian Federation teams entered the competition.

Results

Champion

Awards
The following awards were given at the conclusion of the tournament:

References

External links 
 

U16 2015
2015
2015–16 in Jordanian football
2015 in Asian football